Las Sergas de Esplandián (The Adventures of Esplandián) is a novel written by Garci Rodríguez de Montalvo in the late fifteenth or early sixteenth century. The novel is a sequel to a popular fifteenth century set of chivalric romance novels, Amadís de Gaula. While the novel itself has met with some criticism for its lack of literary style, it achieved particular notability in 1862, when Edward Everett Hale concluded that the novel was the origin of the name California.

History
Garci Rodríguez de Montalvo initially translated and recast Amadís de Gaula from Portuguese to Spanish. The original Amadis was in three volumes, but Montalvo added a fourth that is considered to be mostly his own work. Upon completion, Montalvo wrote the sequel, Las Sergas de Esplandián, regarding the exploits of Esplandián, the son of Amadis. The oldest known surviving edition of this work was published in Seville in July 1510. Earlier editions are thought to have been published in Seville as early as 1496. Ruth Putnam argues that Montalvo finished his novel sometime after 1492, but before Queen Isabella died in 1504. Montalvo is thought to have died in 1505, leaving some of his works to be published after his death.

In the sixth chapter of Don Quixote, written by Miguel de Cervantes in 1605, Montalvo's sequel is mentioned as one of the books in Quixote's library. When Quixote's niece, the housekeeper, and the parish curate set out to destroy Quixote's library, considered the source of Quixote's fanciful behavior, Las Sergas de Esplandián is the first book selected for the pyre.

California
Chivalric novels were popular at the time the Spanish empire was beginning to explore the New World. Such novels were a mix of truth, lore, and fiction, but with little clarity as to where each aspect of the novels fell. The explorers used the novels as a source of inspiration, while the authors of the novels, in turn, used the reports of new explorations to embellish their tales.

The Esplandián novel describes a fictional island named California, inhabited only by black women, ruled by Queen Calafia, and east of the Indies.  When Spanish explorers, under the command of Hernán Cortés, learned of an island off the coast of Western Mexico, and rumored to be ruled by Amazon women, they named it California. Believing the Pacific Ocean, then called the South Sea, was much smaller than it turned out to be, the island seemed to precisely be east of the Indies just as the island of California was described in Montalvo's novel. Once the island was determined to be a peninsula, the name California had already been adopted, and the "island" eventually became known as the Baja California Peninsula.

References

Bibliography

External links
 1526 edition, original from Library of Catalonia (digitized 2009)
 hosted by Google Books
 hosted by the Internet Archive
 1588 edition hosted by the Spanish national library
 Edward Everett Hale (1885) "The Queen of California" in His Level Best: And Other Stories. (Google eBook) Translation from the Sergas of Esplandian of every passage relating to the imagined island of California. Reprinted in part from an unsigned article in the Atlantic Monthly for March 1864.

1510 novels
1510s fantasy novels
Spanish novels
Spanish fantasy novels
Characters in Spanish novels
Series of books
Chivalric sagas
Spanish Golden Age
Fictional knights
Latin American folklore
Mythological islands
Etymology of California